This is a list of foreign ministers of Guinea-Bissau.

1973–1982: Victor Saúde Maria
1982–1983: Samba Lamine Mané
1983–1984: Fidélis Cabral d'Almada
1984–1992: Júlio Semedo
1992–1995: Bernardino Cardoso
1995–1996: Ansumane Mané
1996–1999: Fernando Delfim da Silva
1999............ Hilia Barber
1999–2000: José Pereira Baptista
2000–2001: Mamadú Iaia Djaló
2001............ Faustino Imbali
2001............ Antonieta Rosa Gomes
2001............ Malam Mané
2001–2002: Filomena Mascarenhas Tipote
2002–2003: Joãozinho Vieira Có
2003............ Fatumata Djau Baldé
2003–2004: João José Monteiro
2004–2005: Soares Sambú
2005–2007: António Isaac Monteiro
2007–2009: Maria da Conceição Nobre Cabral
2009............ Adiato Djaló Nandigna
2009–2011: Adelino Mano Quetá
2011–2012: Mamadu Saliu Djaló Pires
2012–2013: Faustino Imbali
2013–2014: Fernando Delfim da Silva
2014–2015: Mário Lopes da Rosa
2015............ Rui Dia de Sousa
2015–2016: Artur Silva
2016–2016: Soares Sambú
2016–2018: Jorge Malú
2018–2019: João Ribeiro Butiam Có
2019–2020: Suzi Barbosa
2019............ Aristides Ocante Da Silva
2020............ Ruth Monteiro
2020–present: Suzi Barbosa

Sources
Rulers.org – Foreign ministers E–K

Foreign
Foreign Ministers
 
1973 establishments in Portuguese Guinea